Elections to West Lindsey District Council were held on 10 June 2004. One third of the council was up for election and the Conservative Party gained overall control of the council from no overall control.

After the election, the composition of the council was:
 Conservative 19
 Liberal Democrat 16
 Independent 2

Election result

One Conservative candidate was unopposed.

Ward results

References
 2004 West Lindsey election result
 Ward results

2004
2004 English local elections
2000s in Lincolnshire